Darya "Dasha" Alexandrovna Zhukova (born 8 June 1981) is a Russian-American art collector, businesswoman, magazine editor, and socialite. She is the founder of the Garage Museum of Contemporary Art and Garage Magazine.

Early life and education 
Darya Alexandrovna Zhukova was born in Moscow on 8 June 1981. Her father is Alexander Zhukov, an oil trader. Her mother is Yelena Zhukova, a Russian-Jewish scientist of molecular biology. Her parents separated when she was 3. In 1991, she moved with her mother to the United States, settling in the Houston area as her mother had relocated due to work. They later moved to Los Angeles, California. By the time Yelena retired, she was a professor of molecular biology at UCLA, as well as an authority on diabetes.

Zhukova attended a Jewish day-school in California. It was a Hebrew college, Dasha's first school in the US, and she attended it for three years. She attended Pacific Hills School, graduating in 1999. She graduated with honors from the University of California, Santa Barbara with degrees in Slavic studies and literature. After becoming involved with Roman Abramovich, she returned to Moscow and later moved to London, where she enrolled at the London's College of Naturopathic Medicine but did not complete the program.

Career 
In 2006, Zhukova co-founded the fashion label Kova & T. She currently sits on the boards for the Los Angeles County Museum of Art, Metropolitan Museum of Art, and The Shed.

In 2008, Zhukova founded the Garage Center for Contemporary Culture (part-funded by Abramovich) in Moscow, a nonprofit organization supporting the advancement of contemporary art and culture in Russia and abroad. In 2012, the center launched the first comprehensive art education program and public archive of Russian art in the country. In 2014, the institution changed its name to Garage Museum of Contemporary Art and, the following year, moved to its first permanent home in Gorky Park. The building, designed by Rem Koolhaas, is a preservation project that transformed a 1968 Soviet Modernist restaurant into a radical space for exhibitions, publishing, research, and education.

In February 2009, Zhukova was appointed editor-in-chief of the fashion magazine Pop. Many in the industry saw her as an unlikely replacement for launch editor Katie Grand. In an interview at the time she was unable to name a single artist she admired, saying she was bad with names. She resigned from the position after three issues in November 2010.

In addition, Zhukova is the Editorial Director of GARAGE magazine, a biannual print publication that focuses on the collaboration between contemporary art and fashion. Since its inception, GARAGE magazine has worked with some of the world's most celebrated creators, and initiated global artistic dialogues. Among the magazine's contributors are artists such as Jeff Koons, Damien Hirst, Nick Knight, Marc Jacobs, Richard Prince, John Baldessari, Inez & Vinoodh, and Patrick Demarchelier. The magazine took its name and spirit from Garage Museum of Contemporary Art. She also is a founding member of the Culture Shed in New York.

Racist chair controversy 

The photograph was widely criticized as racist.  cropped the chair from the photo and Zhukova apologised, describing the chair as artwork and as "commentary on gender and racial politics". Zhukova added, "I utterly abhor racism and would like to apologise to those offended by my participation in this shoot".

Philanthropy
Zhukova donated to Hillary Clinton's presidential campaign. She also donated to the Democratic National Committee.

Personal life 
In 2008, Zhukova married Roman Abramovich, a Russian businessman and investor who is the main owner of the private investment company Millhouse LLC. The couple had two children, a son and daughter, who were both born in the United States. In August 2017, the couple announced that they would separate.

On 11 October 2019, Zhukova married Stavros Niarchos II, son of Philip Niarchos, in a civil ceremony in Paris, France. In March 2021, she gave birth to her third child, and her first with Niarchos, a son named Philip Stavros Niarchos.

Zhukova holds dual Russian and American citizenship.

References 
https://www.nytimes.com/2023/03/03/style/dasha-zhukovas-oligarch-russia-art.html?searchResultPosition=1
Dasha Zhukova’s Artful Rise. – The oligarch’s ex-wife had carefully built a place for herself in the art world. And then, Putin’s war started. By Caitlin Moscatello, New York Times, March 3, 2023

External links
 Garage Magazine
 Garage Center for Contemporary Culture
 Socialite Dasha Zhukova Sat on a Black Woman 'Art' Chair – featured in The Cut

1981 births
Living people
21st-century American businesswomen
21st-century American businesspeople
21st-century philanthropists
21st-century Russian businesspeople
American art collectors
American chief executives of fashion industry companies
American female models
American nonprofit chief executives
American philanthropists
American women fashion designers
American fashion designers
American socialites
American people of Russian-Jewish descent
Businesspeople from Moscow
Jewish American artists
Jewish fashion designers
Jewish female models
Jewish women in business
Jewish women philanthropists
Museum founders
Race-related controversies in photography
Russian art collectors
Russian chief executives
Russian emigrants to the United States
Russian fashion designers
Russian female models
Russian Jews
Russian magazine publishers (people)
Russian socialites
Russian women in business
Naturalized citizens of the United States
University of California, Santa Barbara alumni
Russian women fashion designers
Russian businesspeople in the United States
21st-century American Jews
21st-century women philanthropists
Abramovich family